Pietro Spinosa (born 5 January 1963) is an Italian football manager who is the goalkeeper coach of Ternana.

Career

Playing career

Spinosa started his career with Italian fourth tier side Lavello. In 1984, Spinosa signed for Fidelis Andria in the Italian third tier, where he made over 101 league appearances and scored 0 goals. In 1994, he signed for Italian fourth tier club Civitanovese.

In 1995, Spinosa signed for Castel di Sangro in the Italian third tier,  where during the play-off final against Ascoli he was substituted on before the penalty shoot-out and made the decisive save, helping them earn promotion to the Italian second tier for the first time.

Managerial career

In 1997, Spinosa was appointed goalkeeper coach of Italian third tier team Savoia. In 1999, he was appointed goalkeeper coach of Williams Ephs in the United States. In 2001, he was appointed goalkeeper coach of Italian third tier outfit Livorno. In 2004, Spinos returned to Livorno in the Italian Serie A. In 2009, he was appointed goalkeeper coach of Belgian second tier side Eupen.

In 2011, he was appointed goalkeeper coach of CFR Cluj in the Romanian top flight. After that, Spinosa was appointed goalkeeper coach of Italian Serie A club Chievo. In 2013, he returned to Williams Ephs in the United States. In 2014, he was appointed goalkeeper coach of Indian top flight team Pune City. In 2020, Spinosa was appointed goalkeeper coach of Ternana in Italy.

References

External links
 Pietro Spinosa at Carriere calciatori

1963 births
A.S.D. Castel di Sangro Calcio players
Association football goalkeepers
Civitanovese Calcio players
Italian expatriate footballers
Italian expatriate sportspeople in Belgium
Italian expatriate sportspeople in India
Italian expatriate sportspeople in Romania
Italian expatriate sportspeople in the United States
Italian footballers
Living people
Serie B players
Serie C players
Serie D players
S.S. Turris Calcio players
U.S.D. Città di Fasano players